Metro Świętokrzyska is a transfer station on Lines M1 and M2 of the Warsaw Metro, located under the crossing of Świętokrzyska and Marszałkowska streets in the borough of Śródmieście. The station on M1 was opened on 11 May 2001 as part of the extension of M1 north from Centrum to Ratusz. Świętokrzyska is used as a change-over between Lines M1 and M2, and is the only transfer between M1 and M2 metro lines.
The station on the second metro line fully opened for passenger use on 8 March 2015 as part of the inaugural stretch of Line M2 between Rondo Daszyńskiego and Dworzec Wileński. It was designed by Polish architect Andrzej M. Chołdzyński and constructed by Metroprojekt. Murals were created by Wojciech Fangor, artist of the Polish School of Posters.

Gallery

References

External links

ZTM Municipal Transport Authority website - Warsaw Metro page

Railway stations in Poland opened in 2001
Line 1 (Warsaw Metro) stations
Line 2 (Warsaw Metro) stations
Śródmieście, Warsaw